The 1968 German Grand Prix was a Formula One motor race held at the Nürburgring on 4 August 1968. It was race 8 of 12 in both the 1968 World Championship of Drivers and the 1968 International Cup for Formula One Manufacturers. The race was held in extremely wet and foggy conditions, and British driver Jackie Stewart, racing with a broken wrist, won the race by a margin of four minutes in what is widely considered to be one of the greatest victories in the history of Formula One.

The race is also notable for Dan Gurney's choice of a full face helmet, making him the first driver to do so in Grand Prix racing.

Report

Background 
After Jo Siffert had surprisingly won the previous race at Brands Hatch, the paddock arrived at the Nürburgring almost unchanged. Equally unchanged was the weather: with rain over the entire weekend, this was to be the fifth wet race in a row. BMW entered a Lola-built Formula Two car driven by Hubert Hahne in order to evaluate their competitiveness in Formula One.

Practice and qualifying 
On Saturday, conditions were so poor, with visibility down to mere ten yards, that the organizers scheduled an additional practice session for Sunday morning. Still many drivers slid off the track during the morning session. Eventually, Jacky Ickx took pole positions by a full 10 seconds from second placed Chris Amon, both in a Ferrari. Jackie Stewart in his Matra MS10 was down in sixth place on the grid. At the time, Ickx became the youngest person ever to sit on pole, a record beaten 14 years later when Andrea de Cesaris achieved pole position at the 1982 United States Grand Prix West.

Race 
Even with the conditions treacherous, 200,000 spectators turned up for the race on Sunday afternoon. The race turned out to be a one-man show by Scotsman Jackie Stewart. While Graham Hill took the lead at the start, by the end of the first lap Stewart had moved into first place and built a nine-second lead. He put his superior Dunlop wet tires to great effect and by the end of lap 2, had extended his lead to 34 seconds. When the race ended after 14 laps, Stewart crossed the line more than 4 minutes in front of second placed Hill. The eventual World Champion had spun on lap 11, but was able to get out of the car, push it into the right direction and keep going before third-placed Jochen Rindt could catch up. Chris Amon had battled with Hill for 11 laps over second place, rarely having more than a second between the two, until Amon spun out of the race on the same lap as Hill did.

Reactions 
Stewart described the race as a "teeth gritting effort" in his autobiography. About the first lap he wrote:

The race has been described as Stewart's best drive ever, with the Scot later confirming he felt the same way.

Classification

Qualifying

Race

Championship standings after the race

Drivers' Championship standings

Constructors' Championship standings

Note: Only the top five positions are included for both sets of standings.

References

Further reading

External links

German Grand Prix
German Grand Prix
European Grand Prix
German Grand Prix